Oyster Creek may refer to:

Australia 

 Oyster Creek, Queensland, a locality in the Gladstone Region

United States 

Oyster Creek (New Jersey), a tributary of Little Egg Harbor in Ocean County
Oyster Creek Nuclear Generating Station, a nuclear power plant on the above creek
Oyster Creek, Texas, a city in Brazoria County
Oyster Creek (Texas), a river in Fort Bend and Brazoria Counties